Hantaara, Hantara, Gacanka Hantaara, Hantara Bay; is a coastal habitat in the Bari region of Somalia that is believed to be one of the largest natural harbours in the country. Hantaara also belongs to a sizeable bay, there are date farms and a wider range of mountainous grassland including the Hantaara plateau. The area has mineral and coal deposits, and is abundant in frankincense trees and myrrh trees.

References

External links
 Hantaara, Bari Somalia

Geography of Somalia
Habitats
Populated places in Bari, Somalia